Uloborus rufus is a species of spiders of the family Uloboridae. It is endemic in Cape Verde. The species was named and described by Günter E. W. Schmidt and Rolf Harald Krause in 1995.

References

Further reading
Schmidt & Krause, 1995 : Weitere Spinnen von Cabo Verde. Entomologische Zeitschrift, Frankfurt am Main, vol. 105, no 18, p. 355-364.

Uloboridae
Spiders of Africa
Spiders described in 1995
Taxa named by Günter E. W. Schmidt
Taxa named by Rolf Harald Krause
Arthropods of Cape Verde
Endemic fauna of Cape Verde